Tuman bay can refer to one of the two sultans of the Mamluk Sultanate:

 Al-Adil Sayf ad-Din Tuman bay I (1501)
 Al-Ashraf Tuman bay II (1516–1517)

See also 
Tumanbay (radio drama), a historical drama podcast from BBC Radio